Russian South is a 2021 Russian romantic comedy film directed by Anton Fedotov.
The plot is about the Black Sea, whose attention is sought by three men admiring one woman with someone, and love is jealous of three guys are fighting, the film stars Stasya Miloslavskaya, Semyon Treskunov, Rinal Mukhametov, and Aleksandr Metyolkin.

It is scheduled to be theatrically released on March 4, 2021, by Sony Pictures Productions and Releasing (SPPR).

Plot 
Student Artem Dudin falls in love with a young beauty from the Black Sea. Having lost his head, he drops everything and goes for his beloved to the Russian South, about which he knows nothing. Artem takes a train from Voronezh, which leaves for Krasnodar Krai. At sea, it turns out that the beautiful Ksyusha is already being looked after by two serious local competitors - a handsome sailor and a daring policeman. It seems that the naive student simply has no chance. Even the help of his new friends seems to only get in the way. But Artem is not going to give up.

Ksyusha Gordeeva was already planning to marry the local sentimental policeman, Igor. However, at some point, the love relationship completely changes when a cadet of the naval school, Nikita, also proposes. Ksyusha, meanwhile, does not have time in the city and most of the time is engaged in diving and training at sea. 

Ksyusha is preparing for the wedding in a wedding dress on a sea yacht in the middle of the Black Sea. Suddenly, a stowaway passenger Artem demands a legal marriage. Ksyusha saves herself by diving into the sea, and after landing safely swims to the shore. 

A cadet of the naval school, Nikita is actively pursuing Ksyusha. The policeman, Igor, is also following the trail of this relationship. The marriage is offered on the waterfront in Kabardinka. Just before the bride ties the marriage knot, rivals appear to capture the heroine. Igor defends himself with standard weapons. Meanwhile, Nikita is defending himself with his Cossack influence and his family.

Cast 
 Stasya Miloslavskaya as Ksenia 'Ksyusha' Gordeeva, a diver
Semyon Treskunov as Artem Dudin, a simple-minded student from Voronezh, is simultaneously seek the heart of Ksyusha.
 Rinal Mukhametov as Nikita, a Russian Navy cadet of the Naval School, leads a Cossack lifestyle until his beloved Ksyusha.
 Aleksandr Metyolkin as Igor, a policeman, and his beloved Ksyusha.
 Roman Madyanov as Petr Ivanovich, Igor's father
 Eldar Kalimulin as Mityai
 Daniil Vakhrushev as Eldarchik
 Magomed Murtazaaliev as Ruslan
 Darya Feklenko as Ulyana Gordeeva
 Aleksandr Robak as Leonid Gordeev
 Sergey Lavygin as Oleg
 Gleb Puskepalis as Vano 
 Ekaterina Ageeva as Marina
 Ekaterina Kabak as Yana

Production

Development 
The director chose the picturesque Krasnodar Krai, where many films have been shot recently. The administration of the Krasnodar Territory also supports cinematography. The project was produced by Fyodor Bondarchuk. The action takes place against the backdrop of spectacular landscapes, luxurious nature and the warm sea of the Black Sea coast of the Caucasus.

Mikhail Vrubel and Aleksandr Andryushchenko, the producers of the Vodorod Film Company, wanted to continue the traditions of Russian romantic-comedy cinema. The producers knew they wanted to create a film that would contrast with the exact opposite of the film - the northern ones Ice (2018 film).

Russian South was the perfect film, which, in their opinion, described the modern tourist attraction of Russia - Krasnodar Territory. The film explores the south of Russia, its landscapes, tourism, and generally shooting in this region is a rarity. The film is also produced by Art Pictures Studio, STS Media, and National Media Group Studio.

Filming 
Principal photography of the film began in August 2020, director  Anton Fedotov chose the Krasnodar Krai as the locations: the town of Gelendzhik, the selo of Kabardinka in Gelendzhik District, the selo of Arkhipo-Osipovka in Gelendzhik District, and the city of Novorossiysk, as well as the territory of a unique natural object - the Chushka Spit.

The characters will be created based on the Kuban Cossacks were involved in the filming. They can be found in a mass wedding scene in the selo of Kabardinka, and the background song will be performed by Oleg Gazmanov.

Release 
Premiere of the film Russian South was held in Moscow at the "Karo 11 October" cinema center on February 25, and was theatrically released in the Russian Federation on March 4, 2021, by Sony Pictures Productions and Releasing (SPPR).

Marketing 
The first teaser trailer of Russian South was released on December 17, 2020.

Reception

Critical response
The review from Film.ru allows us to consider Russian South a tragicomedy, which begins with a comedy and ends with a tragedy. A review of the film in KinoAfish explains that “the film is not without flaws. In the end, residents of Krasnodar Krai will like the film.

Maria Tokmasheva wrote for a review of the film at Kino-Teatr.ru: "Although the film seems to be put together from several parts, it is an entertaining southern 'lyrical comedy' that displays the clichés and traditions of the South on the screen."
A review of the film noted that "the script is similar to a Russian Odyssey. Only it was not written by Homer, but by Zhora Kryzhovnikov and others. Ksenia is Penelope who is being pulled down by the suitors in the middle of the sea."

Sergei Obolonkov wrote for a review of the film in Kino Mail.ru: "The secondary character actors, who are the fathers of the groom in the plot, performed well. Roman Madyanov and Aleksandr Robak, who got the roles of fathers of potential suitors, are very colorful."

References

External links 
 

2021 films
2020s Russian-language films
2021 romantic comedy films
2020s comedy road movies
Russian romantic comedy films
Russian comedy road movies
Tragicomedy films
Films about weddings
Black Sea in fiction
Films shot in the North Caucasus
Films shot in Krasnodar Krai